The 2003 Island Games on the island of Guernsey was the 8th edition in which a men's Association football tournament was played at the multi-games competition. It was contested by 15 teams.

Guernsey won the tournament for the second time.

Participants

 Isle of Man

Group phase

Group A

Group B

Group C

 Rhodes originally entered into Group 3 but withdrew from the tournament following their final game against Guernsey, which was abandoned at 70 minutes (with Guernsey leading 2–1 – Goals: Ryan Tippett 2) after they had five players sent off.  Rhodes' previous two games (6–1 vs. Orkney and 5–1 vs. Alderney) were expunged from the records.

Group D

Placement play-off matches

13th place match

9th – 12th place semi-finals

5th – 8th place semi-finals

11th place match

9th place match

7th place match

5th place match

Final stage

Semi-finals

3rd Place Match

Final

Final rankings

External links
Official 2003 website

2003
Gibraltar in international football
Football in Guernsey
Island
Men